The 2019–20 Naisten Liiga season was the thirty-seventh season of the Naisten Liiga, the premier level of women's ice hockey in Finland, since the league’s establishment in 1982.

The postseason was cancelled by the Finnish Ice Hockey Association on 12 March 2020 in response to public health concerns surrounding the COVID-19 pandemic. The 2020 Aurora Borealis Cup Final between Kiekko-Espoo and KalPa was scheduled to begin on 14 March 2020. With the cancellation of the remainder of the season, the 2019–20 season became the first and only Naisten Liiga season to date in which the Finnish Championship was not awarded.

League changes

Season format 
The season format designated for the 2019–20 season was a modified version of the format established for the 2018–19 season. While the opening series remained unchanged, the divisional series was expanded to six teams in each division. In order to fill the two empty slots of the Lower Division, two teams from the Naisten Mestis were added to the Liiga for the divisional series and onward. The playoff format was modified to account for the increased number of teams; eight teams would qualify for the playoffs rather than the previous six. This change allowed for a traditional single-elimination tournament to be played from the quarterfinal stage rather than having the top two teams automatically progress to the semifinal round.

Preliminaries

The preliminaries are played as a double round-robin plus a two-game Opening Weekend Tournament; each of the ten teams plays a total of twenty matches. Points are awarded by match outcome: three points for a regulation win, two points for an overtime win, one point for an overtime loss, and no points/zero points for a regulation loss. The points earned in the opening series determine which division a team will be sorted for the continuation of the season.

Regular season

The regular season, also called the upper division series, is played by the top six teams from the preliminaries. Like the preliminaries, the series  is played as a double round-robin, with each team playing a total of ten games.  All six teams in the regular season are guaranteed placement in the playoffs; the cumulative points earned in the thirty games of the preliminaries and regular season are used to establish the teams' playoff berths, from first to sixth. Only points scored in the upper division series are considered when determining the players who will receive the Marianne Ihalainen Award, for most regular season points earned, and the Tiia Reima Award, for most regular season goals scored; players in the lower division series are ineligible for the awards.

Lower division series

The bottom four teams from the preliminary series move on to the lower division series, where they are joined by the top two teams from the cross-qualifiers of the Naisten Mestis, the league directly below Naisten Liiga. The lower division series teams compete for the seventh and eighth seed positions in the playoffs; only the top two ranked teams from the lower division earn placement in the playoffs. Unlike the regular season/upper division series, all lower division teams start with zero points, only points earned in the series are considered when the teams are ranked.

Qualifiers

The lower division teams ranked third through sixth continue on to the qualifiers. The points earned in the six qualifying series games are added to the points totals from the lower division series. The two teams with the highest point totals qualify for the following Naisten Liiga season, the two lower ranked teams are relegated to or remain in the Naisten Mestis for the following season.

Teams

Regular season

Preliminaries 
Series was played from 7 September to 24 November 2019. Top six teams advanced to the Upper Division, while teams ranking sixth through tenth progressed to the Lower Division.

Divisional series 
Upper Division

Lower Division

Playoffs 
The Naisten Liiga 2019–2020 Playoffs began 22 February 2020.

Bracket

Quarterfinals

Semifinals

Statistics

Scoring leaders
Preliminary series

The following players led the league in points at the conclusion of the preliminary series on 24 November 2019.

Divisional series

The following players led the Upper Division in regular season points at the conclusion of the series on 2 February 2020.

The following players led the Lower Division in regular season points at the conclusion of the series on 2 February 2020.

Leading goaltenders

Preliminary series

The following goaltenders led the league in save percentage at the conclusion of the preliminary series on 24 November 2019, while starting at least one third of matches.

Divisional series

The following goaltenders led the Upper Division in regular season save percentage at the conclusion of match(es) on 29 January 2020, while starting at least one third of matches.

The following goaltenders led the Lower Division in regular season save percentage at the conclusion the series on 2 February 2020, while starting at least one third of matches.

Awards

Finnish Ice Hockey Association awards

Riikka Nieminen Award (Best Player): Tanja Niskanen, KalPa
Tuula Puputti Award (Best Goaltender): Johanna Oksman, Kärpät
Päivi Halonen Award (Best Defenceman): Nelli Laitinen, Kiekko-Espoo
Katja Riipi Award (Best Forward): Elisa Holopainen, KalPa
Noora Räty Award (Best Rookie): Krista Parkkonen, HIFK
Sari Fisk Award (Best Plus/Minus): Matilda Nilsson, KalPa
Marianne Ihalainen Award (Regular season most points): Saila Saari, Kärpät
Tiia Reima Award (Regular season most goals): Elisa Holopainen, KalPa
Emma Laaksonen Award (Fair-Play Player): Viivi Vainikka, Team Kuortane
Student Athlete Award: Tanja Koljonen, Ilves
U18 Student Athlete Award: Nelli Laitinen, Kiekko-Espoo
Hannu Saintula Award (Coach of the Year): Marjo Voutilainen, KalPa
Karoliina Rantamäki Award (MVP of the Playoffs): not awarded
Anu Hirvonen Award (Best Referee): Johanna Tauriainen
Johanna Suban Award (Best Linesman): Johanna Oksanen

Source: Finnish Ice Hockey Association

2019–20 Naisten Liiga All-Stars

All-Star Team
 Goaltender: Johanna Oksman, Kärpät
 Defenceman: Nelli Laitinen, Kiekko-Espoo
 Defenceman: Minttu Tuominen, Kiekko-Espoo
 Winger: Elisa Holopainen, KalPa
 Center: Tanja Niskanen, KalPa
 Winger: Matilda Nilsson, KalPa

All-Star Team II
 Goaltender: Tiina Ranne, KalPa
 Defenceman: Isa Rahunen, Kärpät
 Defenceman: Kreetta Kulhua, Ilves
 Winger: Kiira Yrjänen, Team Kuortane
 Center: Viivi Vainikka, Team Kuortane
 Winger: Ida Karjalainen, HPK

Source: Finnish Ice Hockey Association

Naisten Liiga Player of the Month

 September 2019: Matilda Nilsson, KalPa
 October 2019: Kiira Yrjänen, Team Kuortane
 November 2019: Emmi Rakkolainen, Kiekko-Espoo
 December 2019: Emmanuelle Passard, HIFK
 January 2020: Viivi Vainika, Team Kuortane

Milestones 

 On 20 October 2019, HPK forward and captain Riikka Noronen scored her 703rd career point, surpassing Linda Välimäki's record and taking sole possession of first on the all-time career points list
 On 24 November 2019, Lukko forward and captain Maija Koski played her 100th Naisten Liiga game

References

External links 
Naisten Liiga official website (in Finnish)

2019–20 in Finnish ice hockey
2019–20 in European ice hockey leagues
2019–20 in women's ice hockey leagues
Naisten Liiga (ice hockey) seasons
Naisten Liiga season